Cook's rattail, Coelorinchus cookianus, is a species of rattail found around New Zealand at depths of between 250 and 900 m.  Its length is between 10 and 25 cm.

References
 
 
Tony Ayling & Geoffrey Cox, Collins Guide to the Sea Fishes of New Zealand,  (William Collins Publishers Ltd, Auckland, New Zealand 1982) 

Macrouridae
Endemic marine fish of New Zealand
Fish described in 1980